PPDK may refer to:
 Pyruvate, phosphate dikinase, an enzyme
 Democratic Party of Kosovo